The 2021–22 San Diego State Aztecs men's basketball team represented San Diego State University during the 2021–22 NCAA Division I men's basketball season. The Aztecs, led by fifth-year head coach Brian Dutcher, played their home games at Viejas Arena as members in the Mountain West Conference. They finished the season 23–9, 13–4 in Mountain West Play to finish in third place. As the No. 3 seed in the Mountain West tournament, they defeated Fresno State and Colorado State to advance to the championship game, where they lost to Boise State. They received an at-large bid to the NCAA tournament as the No. 8 seed in the Midwest Region, where they lost in the first round to Creighton.

Previous season
In a season limited due to the ongoing COVID-19 pandemic, the Aztecs finished the 2020–21 season 23–5, 14–3 in Mountain West play to win the regular season championship. In the Mountain West tournament, they defeated Wyoming, Nevada, and Utah State to win the tournament championship. As a result, they received the conference's automatic bid to the NCAA tournament as the No. 6 seed in the Midwest region. There they lost in the first round to Syracuse.

Offseason

Departures

Incoming transfers

2021 recruiting class

Roster

Schedule and results

|-
!colspan=9 style=| Exhibition

|-
!colspan=9 style=| Non-conference regular season

|-
!colspan=9 style=| Mountain West regular season

|-
!colspan=9 style=| Mountain West tournament

|-
!colspan=9 style=| NCAA tournament

Source

Rankings

*AP does not release post-NCAA Tournament rankings. No coaches poll for Week 1.

References

San Diego State Aztecs men's basketball seasons
San Diego State
San Diego State
San Diego State
San Diego State